is a linear roof garden park in Ōhashi, Meguro, Tokyo, Japan, constructed on a sloping roof rising from 15 to 35 meters above street level.  The garden serves to cover the intersection of two major expressways; the elevated Route 3 (Shuto Expressway) Shibuya radial route (Tanimachi JCT - Yōga) and the deep level subterranean Central Circular Route C2. 

The completed interchange links the Central Circular Route (Shuto Expressway) through the Yamate Tunnel as far as the Bayshore Route in Shinagawa. 

The road junction redevelopment also includes high rise residential housing, retail, a local Meguro government branch office, a library, community meeting rooms and all-weather sports facilities.

Gallery

References

External links
Meguro Sky Garden Official Website

Parks and gardens in Tokyo
Buildings and structures in Meguro
Roof gardens